The 2006–07 Alabama–Huntsville Chargers ice hockey team represented the University of Alabama in Huntsville in Huntsville, Alabama, United States. The Chargers were coached by Doug Ross who was in his twenty-fifth, and final, season as head coach. His assistant coaches were Lance West, John McCabe, and Steve Briere. The Chargers played their home games in the Von Braun Center, and were a member of College Hockey America.

After a 32-game regular season, the Chargers finished with 10 wins, 19 losses, and 3 ties.  Despite finishing last in the CHA in the regular season, the team won all 3 of its games in the CHA Tournament to earn an automatic bid to the 2007 NCAA Division I men's ice hockey tournament.  At the NCAA tournament, the Chargers played to double overtime with #2 overall seed Notre Dame before falling, 3–2.

Roster

|}

Season

Schedule
 Green background indicates win (2 points).
 Red background indicates loss (0 points).
 Yellow background indicates tie (1 point).

|-
!colspan=12 style=""| Regular season

|-
!colspan=12 style=""| CHA Tournament

|-
!colspan=12 style=""| NCAA Tournament

Standings

Statistics

Skaters

Goaltenders

References

Alabama–Huntsville Chargers men's ice hockey seasons
Alabama Huntsville
Ala